A pulsed rocket motor is typically defined as a multiple pulse solid-fuel rocket motor. This design overcomes the limitation of solid propellant motors being unable to be easily shut down and reignited.  The pulse rocket motor allows the motor to be burned in segments (or pulses) that burn until completion of that segment.  The next segment (or pulse) can be ignited on command by either an onboard algorithm or in pre-planned phase.  All of the segments are contained in a single rocket motor case as opposed to  staged rocket motors.

The pulsed rocket motor is made by pouring each segment of propellant separately.  Between each segment is a barrier that prevents the other segments from burning until ignited.  At ignition of a second pulse the burning of the propellant generally destroys the barrier.  

The benefit of the pulse rocket motor is that by the command ignition of the subsequent pulses, near optimal energy management of the propellant burn can be accomplished.  Each pulse can have different thrust level, burn time, and achieved specific impulse depending on the type of propellant used, its burn rate, its grain design, and the current nozzle throat diameter.

References

See also
Pulse jet engine, a very simple jet engine which used ignited "pulses" of gas or atomized fuel for propulsion.
Nuclear pulse propulsion
Pulsed nuclear thermal rocket

Rocket propulsion